The Protepeolini are a tribe of apid bees. The tribe contains only one genus, Leiopodus.

Species
 Leiopodus abnormis (Jörgensen, 1912)
 Leiopodus lacertinus Smith, 1854
 Leiopodus nigripes Friese, 1908
 Leiopodus singularis (Linsley & Michener, 1937)
 Leiopodus trochantericus Ducke, 1907

References
C. D. Michener (2000) The Bees of the World, Johns Hopkins University Press.

Apinae
Bee genera